Toddy O'Sullivan (8 November 1934 – 12 December 2021) was an Irish Labour Party politician who served for sixteen years as a Teachta Dála (TD) for constituencies in Cork, and for five years as a junior minister. He also served as Lord Mayor of Cork from 1980 to 1981.

Early life
A native of the Barrack Street area in the south inner-city area of Cork, O'Sullivan was educated at Greenmount National School before becoming a postal clerk.

Political career
A member of Cork City Council, O'Sullivan was Lord Mayor of Cork for the 1980–1981 term. O'Sullivan first stood as a candidate for Dáil Éireann at the by-election on 7 November 1979 in the Cork City constituency, following the death of Labour TD Patrick Kerrigan. The by-election was won by Fine Gael's Liam Burke, but O'Sullivan was successful at his next attempt, when he topped the poll at the 1981 general election in the new constituency of Cork North-Central.

He was re-elected at the next five general elections, moving in 1987 to Cork South-Central, before losing his seat at the 1997 general election. He stood again at the by-election on 23 October 1998 in Cork South-Central following the death of Fine Gael TD Hugh Coveney, but the seat was won by Coveney's son Simon Coveney.

Ministerial career
In February 1986 he was appointed Minister of State at the Department of the Environment. Along with the other Labour ministers, he resigned on 20 January 1987 in protest at proposed cuts in health spending, bringing about the coalition's collapse.

Six years later, after the 1992 general election led to a coalition with Fianna Fáil, O'Sullivan became Chairman of the Dáil's Enterprise and Economic Strategy Committee. After the collapse of that government and its replacement with the Fine Gael–Labour Party–Democratic Left Rainbow Coalition, Taoiseach John Bruton appointed him in December 1994 as Minister of State at the Department of Tourism and Trade, a position he held until Fianna Fáil returned to power at the 1997 general election.

Death
O'Sullivan died on 12 December 2021, at the age of 87.

References

 

1934 births
2021 deaths
Labour Party (Ireland) TDs
Local councillors in Cork (city)
Lord Mayors of Cork
Members of the 22nd Dáil
Members of the 23rd Dáil
Members of the 24th Dáil
Members of the 25th Dáil
Members of the 26th Dáil
Members of the 27th Dáil
Ministers of State of the 27th Dáil
Ministers of State of the 24th Dáil